A total solar eclipse occurred at the Moon's ascending node of the orbit on Saturday, October 23, 1976. A solar eclipse occurs when the Moon passes between Earth and the Sun, thereby totally or partly obscuring the image of the Sun for a viewer on Earth. A total solar eclipse occurs when the Moon's apparent diameter is larger than the Sun's, blocking all direct sunlight, turning day into darkness. Totality occurs in a narrow path across Earth's surface, with the partial solar eclipse visible over a surrounding region thousands of kilometres wide.
This total solar eclipse began at sunrise in Tanzania near the border with Burundi, with the path of totality passing just north of the large Tanzanian city of Dar es Salaam. It then crossed the Indian Ocean, passing St. Pierre Island, Providence Atoll and Farquhar Atoll of Seychelles before making landfall in southeastern Australia. The largest city that saw totality was Melbourne. After leaving the Australian mainland, the path of totality left the Earth's surface just north of the north island of New Zealand.

Related eclipses

Eclipses in 1976 
 An annular solar eclipse on Thursday, 29 April 1976.
 A partial lunar eclipse on Thursday, 13 May 1976.
 A total solar eclipse on Saturday, 23 October 1976.
 A penumbral lunar eclipse on Saturday, 6 November 1976.

Solar eclipses of 1975–1978

Saros 133

Metonic series

References

External links 

1976 10 23
1976 10 23
1976 in science
October 1976 events